The Vienna Award (also called the Vienna Arbitration or Vienna Diktat) was either of two arbitral decisions made by Nazi Germany and Fascist Italy rewarding disputed territory to Hungary. Both decisions were made at the Belvedere Palace, in Vienna, just before and after the Second World War (1939–1945) started.
First Vienna Award (2 November 1938): Hungary received part of southern Czechoslovakia.
Second Vienna Award (30 August 1940): Hungary received Northern Transylvania from Romania.